Patrick Daniel Tillman Jr. (November 6, 1976 – April 22, 2004) was an American professional football player for the Arizona Cardinals of the National Football League (NFL) who left his sports career and enlisted in the United States Army in May 2002 in the aftermath of the September 11 attacks. His service in Iraq and Afghanistan, as well as subsequent death, were the subject of national attention when he was shot three times in the head at less than 10 yards away by friendly fire.

After playing four seasons in the NFL, Tillman joined the Army Rangers and served several combat tours before he was killed in the mountains of Afghanistan. At first, the Army reported that Tillman had been killed by enemy fire. Controversy ensued when a month later, on May 28, 2004, the Pentagon notified the Tillman family that he had been killed by fire from his own side. The family and other critics allege that the Department of Defense delayed the disclosure until weeks after Tillman's memorial service out of a desire to protect the image of the U.S. military. In 2007, the Pentagon released a report ruling Tillman's death as accidental.

Tillman was the third professional football player to be killed in combat after Bob Kalsu and Don Steinbrunner, who both died during the Vietnam War. Tillman was posthumously promoted from specialist to corporal. He also posthumously received the Silver Star and Purple Heart medals.

Early life and education
Tillman was born on November 6, 1976, in Fremont, California, the son of Mary (Spalding) and Patrick Kevin Tillman. The oldest of three sons, with Kevin and Richard as the other two, Tillman played competitive football. He went to Bret Harte Middle School and helped lead Leland High School to the Central Coast Division I Football Championship. Tillman did not always play football. In his freshman year of high school, he was catcher for his baseball team, but did not make the varsity team. In his sophomore year he decided to concentrate on football. Tillman then went to Arizona State University on a football scholarship.

Tillman was very close to his family and high school friends. He repeatedly mentioned in his personal journals during wartime service that he drew strength from and deeply valued his closest friendships, parents, wife and family. Tillman was very committed to his high school sweetheart, Marie Ugenti, whom he married shortly before his enlistment in the Army. He also was very close with his brother, Kevin, who enlisted with and served alongside him.

College career
He started his college career as a linebacker for Arizona State University in 1994, when he secured the last remaining scholarship for the team. As a junior, he helped his team go undefeated that season as well as helping them make it to the Rose Bowl that year. In 1997, he was voted the Pac-10 Defensive Player of the Year. In the same year, Tillman was also named Arizona State's MVP. 

Tillman majored in marketing and graduated in three and a half years with a 3.85 GPA. He also earned many academic awards including: the Clyde B. Smith Academic Award in 1996 and 1997; the Sporting News Honda Scholar-Athlete of the Year in 1997; and the 1998 Sun Angel Student Athlete of Year. He was inducted into the College Football Hall of Fame in 2010. Tillman was also posthumously inducted into the Arizona Sports Hall of Fame in 2018.

Professional career

In the 1998 National Football League Draft, Tillman was selected as the 226th pick by the Arizona Cardinals. Tillman moved over to play the safety position in the NFL and started ten of 16 games in his rookie season.

At one point in his NFL career, Tillman turned down a five-year, $9 million contract offer from the St. Louis Rams out of loyalty to the Cardinals.

Sports Illustrated football writer Paul Zimmerman named Tillman to his 2000 NFL All-Pro team after Tillman finished with 155 tackles (118 solo), 1.5 sacks, 2 forced fumbles, 2 fumble recoveries, 9 pass deflections and 1 interception for 30 yards.

Tillman finished his career with totals of 340 tackles, 2.5 sacks, 3 interceptions for 37 yards, 3 forced fumbles, 15 pass deflections, and 3 fumble recoveries in 60 career games. In addition, he also had 1 rush attempt for 4 yards and returned 3 kickoffs for 33 yards.

In May 2002, eight months after the September 11 attacks and after completing the 15 remaining games of the 2001 season which followed the attacks, Tillman turned down a contract offer of $3.6 million over three years from the Cardinals to enlist in the U.S. Army.

Military career and death
Tillman and his brother Kevin enlisted on May 31, 2002. In September 2002, they completed basic training together. The two brothers completed the Ranger Assessment & Selection Program in late 2002 and were assigned to the 2nd Ranger Battalion in Fort Lewis, Washington. Tillman resided in University Place with his wife before being deployed to Iraq. After participating in the initial invasion of Iraq as part of Operation Iraqi Freedom, in September 2003, he entered Ranger School at Fort Benning, Georgia; he graduated on November 28, 2003.

Tillman was subsequently deployed to Afghanistan, and posted at FOB Salerno. On April 22, 2004, he was initially reported to have been killed by enemy combatants. An Afghan Militia Force allied soldier was also killed in the action. Tillman's platoon leader First Lieutenant David Uthlaut and his radiotelephone operator (RTO), 19-year-old Jade Lane, were wounded in the incident. The Army initially claimed that Tillman and his unit were attacked in an apparent ambush on a road outside of the village of Sperah about 25 miles (40 km) southwest of Khost, near the Pakistan border. It was not until after his burial that investigations by the Department of Defense and U.S. Congress were launched, eventually ruling his death as having come by friendly fire.

The Washington Post reported that prior to his death, Tillman called the invasion and occupation of Iraq "fucking illegal". 

An investigation by the U.S. Army Criminal Investigation Division (CID) concluded that Tillman and the Afghan militia soldier were killed by friendly fire when one allied group fired upon another in confusion after nearby gunfire was mistakenly believed to be from enemy combatants. The CID Report summary, dated March 19, 2007, stated that:  ... during their movement through the canyon road, Serial 2 [Tillman's platoon had to split up because of a broken HMMWV; the parts were called Serial 1 and 2] was ambushed and became engaged in a running gun battle with enemy combatants. Serial 1 [Tillman's portion of the platoon] had just passed through the same canyon without incident and were approximately one kilometer ahead of Serial 2. Upon hearing explosions, gunfire, and sporadic radio communication from Serial 2, Serial 1 dismounted their vehicles and moved on foot, to a more advantageous position to provide overwatch and fire support for Serial 2's movement out of the ambush. Upon exiting the gorge, and despite attempts by Serial 1 to signal a "friendly position", occupants of the lead vehicle of Serial 2 opened fire on Tillman's position, where he was fatally shot.

The Army Special Operations Command initially claimed that there was an exchange with hostile forces. After a lengthy investigation conducted by Brigadier General Gary M. Jones, the U.S. Department of Defense concluded that both the Afghan militia soldier's and Tillman's deaths were due to friendly fire aggravated by the intensity of the firefight.

Tillman's brother testified before Congress, stating "The deception surrounding this case was an insult to the family, but more importantly, its primary purpose was to deceive a whole nation."

Awards and decorations

Silver Star Citation

Citation:
The President of the United States of America, authorized by Act of Congress July 9, 1918 (amended by an act of July 25, 1963), takes pride in presenting the Silver Star (Posthumously) to Corporal Patrick D. Tillman, United States Army, for gallantry in action while serving with the 2d Battalion, 75th Ranger Regiment, during action in Afghanistan on 22 April 2004, against an armed enemy while serving as a Rifle Team Leader in support of Operation ENDURING FREEDOM. Caught between the crossfire of an enemy near ambush, Corporal Tillman put himself in the line of devastating enemy fire as he maneuvered his fire team to a covered position from which they could effectively employ their weapons on known enemy positions. His audacious leadership and courageous example under fire inspired his men to fight at great risk to their own personal safety, resulting in the enemy's withdrawal, his platoon's safe passage from the ambush kill zone, and his mortal wound. Corporal Tillman's personal courage, tactical expertise, and professional competence directly contributed to his platoon's overall success and survival. In making the ultimate sacrifice for his team and platoon, Corporal Patrick D. Tillman reflected great credit upon himself, the Joint Task Force, and the United States Army.

Awards

In addition to his military awards, Pat Tillman received the Arthur Ashe Courage Award from ESPN in 2003, as part of that year's ESPY Awards ceremony.

Aftermath and legacy

Questions surrounding Tillman's death

A report described in The Washington Post on May 4, 2005, prepared at the request of Tillman's family by Brigadier General Gary M. Jones, revealed that in the days immediately following Tillman's death, Army investigators were aware that Tillman had been killed by friendly fire, shot three times in the head at less than 10 yards away, according to Army doctors. Jones reported that senior Army commanders, including General John Abizaid, knew of this fact within days of the shooting, but nevertheless approved the awarding of the Silver Star, Purple Heart, and a posthumous promotion to the rank of Corporal.

Lieutenant General Stanley McChrystal approved the Silver Star citation on April 28, 2004, which gave a detailed account of Tillman's death including the phrase "in the line of devastating enemy fire," but the next day he sent a P4 confidential memo warning senior government members that Tillman might actually have been killed by friendly fire. Senior commanders within the U.S. Central Command, including former Commander of the United States Central Command (CENTCOM) General John Abizaid, were notified by the P4 memo, which described Tillman's "highly possible" fratricide, four days before Tillman's nationally televised memorial service during which he was lauded as a war hero for dying while engaging the enemy.

Jones reported that members of Tillman's unit burned his body armor and uniform in an apparent attempt to hide the fact that he was killed by friendly fire. His notebook, in which, according to author Jon Krakauer, Tillman had recorded some of his thoughts on Afghanistan, was also burned; "a blatant violation of protocol." Several soldiers were subsequently punished for their actions by being removed from the United States Army Rangers. Jones believed that Tillman should retain his medals and promotion, since, according to Jones, he intended to engage the enemy and behaved heroically.

Tillman's family was not informed of the finding that he was killed by friendly fire until weeks after his memorial service, although at least some senior Army officers knew of that fact prior to the service. According to Krakauer in his book Where Men Win Glory, the extensive coverup that followed Tillman's death included the military's order to Tillman's comrades to lie to his family at the funeral. Tillman's parents have sharply criticized the Army's handling of the incident; Tillman's mother charges that "this lie was to cover their image," while Tillman's father charges that the Army "purposely interfered in the investigation" because of the effect it could have on their recruiting efforts.

He also blamed high-ranking Army officers for presenting "outright lies" to Tillman's family and to the public.

On March 4, 2006, the U.S. Defense Department Inspector General directed the Army to open a criminal investigation of Tillman's death. The Army's Criminal Investigative Division was to determine whether Tillman's death was the result of negligent homicide.

On March 26, 2007, the Pentagon released their report on the events surrounding Tillman's death and coverup. The report reads in part:

Tillman's brother Kevin testified before the United States House Committee on Oversight and Government Reform that: The deception surrounding this [Tillman] case was an insult to the family: but more importantly, its primary purpose was to deceive a whole nation. We say these things with disappointment and sadness for our country. Once again, we have been used as props in a Pentagon public relations exercise.

After Kevin's testimony, Pete Geren, acting secretary of the Army, stated to reporters, "We as an Army failed in our duty to the Tillman family, the duty we owe to all the families of our fallen soldiers: give them the truth, the best we know it, as fast as we can."

Tillman's diary was never returned to his family, and its whereabouts are not publicly known.

One investigation of the autopsy report and photographs by two forensic pathologists in November 2006 concluded that Tillman was most likely killed as a result of fire from a M249 light machine gun. The M249 uses the same ammunition as the M16 rifle and M4 carbine, but is capable of higher rates of fire. This would allow a competent user to place three bullets within a several-inch target from 40 or 50 yards away, even from a moving vehicle.

On July 26, 2007, Chris Matthews reported on Hardball that Tillman's death may have been a case of deliberate murder by Tillman's fellow soldiers – specifically that the bullet holes were tight and neat, suggesting a shot at close range. Matthews based his speculation on a report from the doctors who examined Tillman's body. A possible motive was not identified. When officers and soldiers were asked during a criminal investigation, they said they were certain the shooting was accidental. According to one of his fellow soldiers, Tillman "was popular among his fellow soldiers and had no enemies."

In addition, in response to a Freedom of Information Act request filed by the Associated Press, the Defense Department released 2,300 pages of documents which were reported to indicate:
 There has never been evidence of enemy fire found on the scene, and no members of Tillman's group had been hit by enemy fire.
 The three-star general who withheld details of Tillman's death from his parents for a number of months told investigators approximately 70 times that he had a bad memory and could not recall details of his actions.
 Army attorneys sent each other congratulatory e-mails for keeping criminal investigators at bay as the Army conducted an internal friendly-fire investigation that resulted in administrative, or non-criminal, punishments.
 Army doctors told the investigators that Tillman's wounds suggested murder because "the medical evidence did not match-up with the scenario as described."

Congressional inquiries
On April 24, 2007, Specialist Bryan O'Neal, the last soldier known to see Pat Tillman alive, testified before the House Committee on Oversight and Government Reform that he was warned by superiors not to divulge information that a fellow soldier killed Tillman, especially to the Tillman family. Later, Pat Tillman's brother Kevin Tillman, who was also in the convoy traveling behind his brother at the time of the 2004 incident in Afghanistan but did not witness it, testified that the military tried to spin his brother's death to deflect attention from emerging failings in the Afghan war.

On July 13, 2007, Henry Waxman and Tom Davis, the leading members of the House Committee on Oversight and Government Reform, revealed that the Bush administration and the Pentagon had withheld key documents relating to Tillman's death and denied any new document release request from Congress citing executive privilege.

On August 13, 2007, the Associated Press reported that on behalf of VoteVets, 20 U.S. military veterans who fought in Iraq and Afghanistan asked the NFL commissioner, Roger Goodell, to help secure the release of all documents relating to the death of Pat Tillman.

On July 14, 2008, the House Committee on Oversight and Government Reform released a proposed report titled "Misleading Information from the Battlefield: The Tillman and Lynch Episodes". The committee stated that its "investigation was frustrated by a near universal lack of recall" among "senior officials at the White House" and the military. It concluded: The pervasive lack of recollection and absence of specific information makes it impossible for the Committee to assign responsibility for the misinformation in Specialist Tillman's and Private Lynch's cases. It is clear, however, that the Defense Department did not meet its most basic obligations in sharing accurate information with the families and with the American public.

Memorials and tributes
After his death, family and friends of Tillman including his widow Marie Tillman established the Pat Tillman Foundation to carry forward Tillman's legacy by inspiring and supporting those striving for positive change in themselves and the world. Marie would serve as executive director and then chair of the board.

A highway bypass around the Hoover Dam has a bridge bearing Tillman's name. Completed in October 2010, the Mike O'Callaghan–Pat Tillman Memorial Bridge spans the Colorado River between Nevada and Arizona.

Lincoln Law School of San Jose has established the Pat Tillman Scholarship in honor of Tillman. Tillman's father earned his Juris Doctor from Lincoln in 1983.

On Sunday, September 19, 2004, all teams of the NFL wore a memorial decal on their helmets in honor of Tillman. The Arizona Cardinals continued to wear this decal throughout the 2004 season. Former Cardinals quarterback Jake Plummer requested to also wear the decal for the entire season, but the NFL turned him down, saying his helmet would not be uniform with the rest of the Denver Broncos. Plummer later grew a full beard and his hair long in honor of Tillman, who had such a style in the NFL before cutting his hair and shaving his beard off to fit military uniform guidelines.

The Cardinals retired his number 40, and Arizona State did the same for the number 42 he wore with the Sun Devils. The Cardinals have named the plaza surrounding their State Farm Stadium in Glendale Pat Tillman Freedom Plaza. Later, on November 12, 2006, during a Cardinals game versus the Cowboys, a bronze statue was revealed in his honor. ASU also named the football locker room entryway to Sun Devil Stadium the "Pat Tillman Memorial Tunnel" and made a "PT-42" patch that they place on the neck of their uniforms as a permanent feature. In 2011, Pat Tillman Veteran's Center in the lower level of the Memorial Union opened on the Tempe campus. Before the 2013 season, the Tillman Tunnel was renovated with new graphics and signage. Double doors separate the locker room from the tunnel, and a television with a sound system displays Tillman's career highlights. The gate which opens to the field features an image of Pat Tillman facing the field, looking as if he is leading the team out.

On Saturday, April 15, 2005, 5,000 participants turned out for the inaugural Pat's Run (which has become the annual fundraising event for the Pat Tillman Foundation) in Tempe. The racers traveled along the  course around Tempe Town Lake to the finish line, on the 42-yard line of Sun Devil Stadium in order to commemorate the number which Tillman wore as a Sun Devil and which was later retired in his honor. A second race took place in San Jose. Sponsored by the Pat Tillman Foundation, Pat's Run has continued to grow every year, with more than 28,000 attendees in April 2019. Various "honor runs", in locations such as Austin, Texas, take place around the country at the same time as Pat's Run and are supported by Arizona State University's Alumni Association.

In 2004, the NFL donated $250,000 to the United Service Organizations to build a USO center in memory of Tillman. The Pat Tillman USO Center, the first USO center in Afghanistan, opened on Bagram Air Base on April 1, 2005. As of 2019, the NFL continues to support the Pat Tillman Foundation through its Salute to Service campaign honoring United States military service members along with other military and veteran nonprofits.

The Pacific-10 Conference renamed its annual defensive player-of-the-year award in football to the Pat Tillman Defensive Player of the Year.

Forward Operating Base Tillman was close to the Pakistan border, near the village of Lwara in Paktika Province, Afghanistan.

Tillman's high school, Leland High School in San Jose, renamed its football field after him. In New Almaden, an unincorporated community adjacent to San Jose, where Tillman grew up, a memorial was constructed near the Almaden Quicksilver County Park. This memorial was dedicated in September 2007 during the annual New Almaden Day celebration. In Phoenix, the Balsz School District named a middle school in 2018 after Tillman.

The skateboarding bulldog featured on YouTube and in an Apple iPhone commercial was named after Tillman.

Two books about Tillman were published in 2009. Jon Krakauer, author of Into Thin Air and Into the Wild, chronicles Tillman's story in Where Men Win Glory: The Odyssey of Pat Tillman, published by Doubleday on September 15. Meanwhile, Tillman's mother, Mary Tillman, also wrote a book about her son, Boots on the Ground by Dusk, which was released in April 2008.

Following Tillman's death, the Ohio State Linebackers Corp consisting of A. J. Hawk, Bobby Carpenter and Anthony Schlegel, as well as center Nick Mangold, grew their hair in tribute to Tillman, imitating Tillman's trademark locks.

In September 2008, Rory Fanning, a fellow Army Ranger who was stationed with Tillman in Fort Lewis, Washington, began his "Walk for Pat", a walk across the United States in an effort to raise money and awareness for the Pat Tillman Foundation. The stated fundraising goal is $3.6 million, the value of the contract Tillman turned down when he decided to enlist in the military.

The Arizona State University Sun Devils football team wore special uniforms made by Adidas to honor Tillman and his career on October 29, 2015, when they faced the Oregon Ducks. All proceeds from the uniforms went to the Pat Tillman Foundation.

Super Bowl LVII is dedicated to Tillman. Four Tillman Foundation Scholars performed the ceremonial coin toss.

Criticisms
After reports of Tillman's anti-war views became public, Ted Rall, who had previously written a comic calling Tillman a "fool" and "idiot", said that he was wrong to have assumed Tillman to be a "right wing poster child" when Tillman regarded the invasion of Iraq as illegal.

Then-Lieutenant Colonel Ralph Kauzlarich, Regimental Executive Officer at Forward Operating Base Salerno on Khost, Afghanistan, under which Tillman was serving at the time of his death, and who led the second investigation into Tillman's death, made statements about the Tillman family's search for the truth based on Tillman's atheism. In comments to ESPN, Kauzlarich said: "These people have a hard time letting it go. It may be because of their religious beliefs" and "When you die, I mean, there is supposedly a better life, right? Well, if you are an atheist and you don't believe in anything, if you die, what is there to go to? Nothing. You are worm dirt. So for their son to die for nothing and now he is no more ... I do not know how an atheist thinks, I can only imagine that would be pretty tough."

Kauzlarich conducted the second investigation into Tillman's death which lasted a week, from May 8 to 15, 2004. Brigadier General Rodney Johnson, the Commanding General of the United States Army Criminal Investigations Command, testified before Congress that he found these statements "totally unacceptable". Acting Department of Defense Inspector General Thomas Gimble also testified that he was "shocked" that Lieutenant Colonel Kauzlarich would make these statements. According to AP analysis, three lower-level officers are expected to be punished, and Kauzlarich may be one of the three. Tillman's mother continues to reject the Pentagon's characterization of the officers' offenses as "errors" in reporting Tillman's death, because several officers have said they made conscious decisions not to tell the Tillman family that friendly fire was suspected.

Media analyses
Reviews by The New York Times reporter Dexter Filkins of Jon Krakauer's book Where Men Win Glory: The Odyssey of Pat Tillman noted that the book did well to compile the facts and "nauseating" details regarding the coverup of Tillman's death. "After Tillman's death, Army commanders violated many of their own rules, not to mention elementary standards of decency, to turn the killing into a propaganda coup for the American side," Filkins wrote.

A documentary film, The Tillman Story, was shown at the Sundance Film Festival on January 23, 2010, and was released in August 2010.

On October 19, 2006, Kevin Tillman broke his silence about his brother's death, lashing out at the Iraq War (and American foreign policy in general) in a 660-word essay published on Truthdig, a progressive online journal of news and opinion. The essay was widely distributed and was cited in The New York Times and Associated Press.

Personal life
Tillman was an atheist. According to speakers at his funeral, he was very well-read, having read a number of religious texts including the Bible, Quran and the Book of Mormon as well as transcendentalist authors such as Ralph Waldo Emerson and Henry David Thoreau. However, responding to religious overtones at the funeral by Maria Shriver and John McCain, his youngest brother, Richard, asserted that "Just make no mistake, he'd want me to say this: He's not with God, he's fucking dead, he's not religious." Richard added, "Thanks for your thoughts, but he's fuckin' dead." Another article quotes Tillman as having told then-general manager of the Seattle Seahawks, Bob Ferguson, in December 2003, "You know I'm not religious."

The September 25, 2005, edition of the San Francisco Chronicle newspaper reported that Tillman held views which were critical of the Iraq War. According to Tillman's mother, a friend of Tillman had arranged a meeting for Tillman with author Noam Chomsky, a prominent critic of American foreign and military policy, to take place after his return from Afghanistan.

See also
 A Second Knock at the Door

References

Further reading

External links

 Pat Tillman Foundation

1976 births
2004 deaths
American atheists
American football linebackers
American football safeties
American military personnel killed in the War in Afghanistan (2001–2021)
Arizona Cardinals players
Arizona State Sun Devils football players
College Football Hall of Fame inductees
Cover-ups
Deaths by firearm in Afghanistan
Leland High School (San Jose, California) alumni
Military personnel from California
Military personnel killed by friendly fire
Military scandals
National Football League players with retired numbers
People from Fremont, California
Players of American football from Arizona
Players of American football from San Jose, California
Propaganda in the United States
Recipients of the Silver Star
Sportspeople from the San Francisco Bay Area
United States Army personnel of the War in Afghanistan (2001–2021)
United States Army Rangers
United States Army soldiers